Sinism may refer to:

Korean shamanism, from the word sin
A Chinese worldview, a concept proposed by H. G. Creel

See also
Cynicism (disambiguation)